The 2010 Millennial Anniversary of Hanoi Football Championship was an international football tournament hosted by the  Vietnam Football Federation. It took place in September 2010. The tournament was held at the Mỹ Đình National Stadium, Hanoi.

Venue

Squads

Vietnam 
Coach:  Henrique Calisto

North Korea 
Coach: Jo Tong-Sop

Australia 
Coach: Aurelio Vidmar

Results

References 

2010
Mill
Mill